Robert “R” Kessler is an American former college basketball standout for the Maryland Terrapins. He played for the school for three seasons, from 1953–54 to 1955–56, and scored 1,266 points and grabbed 849 rebounds in his career. Kessler was named to the All-ACC Second Team in his final two seasons while averaging over 20 points per game each year. He led the Terrapins in rebounding both seasons, and after his collegiate career was over, Kessler was selected as the 14th overall pick in the 1956 NBA draft by the Fort Wayne Zollner Pistons. He never played in the league, however. Later on he would get enshrined into the University of Maryland Athletic Hall of Fame as part of the 2007 class.  He is currently a scout for Cheyenne East High School in Cheyenne, WY, USA.

References

Year of birth missing (living people)
Living people
American men's basketball players
Basketball players from Virginia
Fort Wayne Pistons draft picks
Forwards (basketball)
Maryland Terrapins men's basketball players
Sportspeople from Alexandria, Virginia